The 1960 Railway Cup Hurling Championship was the 34th series of the inter-provincial hurling Railway Cup. Three matches were played between 21 February 1960 and 17 March 1960 to decide the title. It was contested by Connacht, Leinster, Ulster and Munster.

Munster entered the championship as the defending champions.

On 17 March 1960, Munster won the Railway Cup after a 6-06 to 2-07 defeat of Leinster in the final at Croke Park, Dublin. It was their fourth Railway Cup title in succession.

Munster's Paddy Barry was the Railway Cup top scorer with 4-01.

Results

Semi-finals

21 February 1960
Leinster
8-6 - 5-3
Ulster
Semi-final

Final

Top scorers

Overall

Single game

External links
 Munster Railway Cup-winning teams

Railway Cup Hurling Championship
Railway Cup Hurling Championship